Philip Francis may refer to:

Philip Francis (translator) (1708–1773), English translator
Philip Francis (politician) (1740–1818), English politician
Philip Francis (golfer), American golfer
Philip V. Francis (1964–2008), tabla player, composer and Ghazal singer from Kerala, India
Philip Francis, Prince of Leyen (1766–1829), German nobleman

See also